was a town located in Kume District, Okayama Prefecture, Japan.

As of 2003, the town had an estimated population of 7,396 and a density of 99.42 persons per km². The total area was 74.39 km².

On February 28, 2005, Kume, along with the town of Kamo, the village of Aba (both from Tomata District), and the town of Shōboku (from Katsuta District), was merged into the expanded city of Tsuyama and no longer exists as an independent municipality.

Geography
Rivers: Yoshii River

Adjoining municipalities
Okayama Prefecture
Tsuyama
Chūō
Asahi
Ochiai
Kuse
Kagamino

Education
Kyōsyō Elementary School
Chūsei Elementary School
Seidō Elementary School
Shūjitsu Elementary School
Kume Junior High School

Transportation

Railways
West Japan Railway Company
Kishin Line
Tsuboi Station - Mimasaka-Sendai Station

Road
Expressways:
Chūgoku Expressway
Kume Bus Stop
Innoshō Interchange (Tsuyama)
National highways:
Route 181
Route 429
Prefectural roads:
Okayama Prefectural Route 70 (Kume-Takebe)
Okayama Prefectural Route 159 (Kume-Chūō)
Okayama Prefectural Route 205 (Mimasaka-Sendai Station)
Okayama Prefectural Route 335 (Yonokami-Kume)
Okayama Prefectural Route 337 (Yamashiro-Miyao)
Okayama Prefectural Route 339 (Nishiichinomiya-Nakagitakami)
Okayama Prefectural Route 340 (Kōmoto-Kume)
Okayama Prefectural Route 341 (Tsuboi-Shimotochibara)
Okayama Prefectural Route 455 (Koyama-Kuwakami)
Roadside Station
Kume no Sato

External links
Official website of Tsuyama in Japanese (some English content)

Dissolved municipalities of Okayama Prefecture
Tsuyama